Kirna is a village in Türi Parish, Järva County in central Estonia.

Kirna Manor
The whole estate was given as a gift to the von Fersen family in 1614 and remained in the ownership for over a hundred years. After 1787, it belonged to various Baltic German and Russian families from the nobility. After 1919 it was used as a school up until World War II. During the Soviet occupation of Estonia, the manor housed the offices of a collective farm.

The building received its present appearance during a neoclassical reconstruction of an earlier building around 1820. The hall and other ceremonial rooms on the main floor was at that time also decorated with typical stucco ornaments. Some later additions were in a neo-Gothic style.

See also
 List of palaces and manor houses in Estonia

References

External links
Kirna manor at Estonian Manors Portal

Villages in Järva County
Kreis Jerwen
Manor houses in Estonia